The YCG-1 was a class of electric locomotives built in the 1930s for use on the metre-gauge electrified lines in the Chennai area. The name stands for (Y)metre gauge, (C)DC electric, (G)goods. With the conversion of the lines to 25 kv AC, all were withdrawn. One is preserved at National Rail Museum in New Delhi.

History 
These were used in Chennai with 1,5 kV DC overhead wires. Goods locos used on the early DC electrified network of SR, and later withdrawn when SR switched to AC traction. They had a provision for coupling to 'ET' class 4-wheeled battery tenders to allow operating on unelectrified sidings, loop lines, etc. These locos had a roughly rectangular, box-like body with a cab at either end, with a short platform extending from each cab. The cabs each had a door opening on to the platform, and a window (on the right) at the ends. The two bogies had interconnecting linkages to allow easier negotiation of sharp curves. Two 'diamond' style pantographs for current collection. There were only seven of these locos; one is now preserved at the NRM (#21900).

Locomotive shed 
  All the locomotives of this class has been withdrawn from service.

See also
 Locomotives of India

Electric locomotives of India
Metre gauge electric locomotives